Kiwaia neglecta is a moth in the family Gelechiidae. It was described by Philpott in 1924. It is found in New Zealand.

The wingspan is 10–13 mm. The forewings are ochreous-whitish with a ferruginous suffusion along the fold, sometimes extended to before the apex, sometimes absent. The area beneath the fold is usually clearer white. The hindwings are pale fuscous-grey.

References

Kiwaia
Moths described in 1924
Endemic fauna of New Zealand
Moths of New Zealand
Endemic moths of New Zealand